Ernestown Secondary School or ESS is a Canadian public, comprehensive school located in Odessa, Ontario, Canada.   The school services about 450 students from Loyalist Township, Napanee and Stone Mills, Ontario. The town is in the eastern Ontario county of Lennox and Addington approximately 24 kilometers west of the city of Kingston, Ontario. The school offers classes for students in grades nine through twelve and is a member school of the Limestone District School Board.
The school motto at ESS is Amor Doctrinae Floreat - "Let the Love of Learning Flourish"

History
The Odessa Continuation School that had serviced the community of Odessa for more than 40 years, closed in 1947.  Ernestown Township then joined the Napanee and District High School area and with this change, area students were required to bus to the school in Napanee.

In 1958, Reeve Erwell Huff, petitioned to allow Ernestown to withdraw from the school area of Napanee, which town council overwhelmingly endorsed. In September 1959, the first students were housed temporarily at the Township Hall and in a new cement block building erected in the town of Odessa.  The student population was little more than 200 students.  Ground breaking at the current site took place in 1959 and in 1960 Ernestown High School opened its doors at the present location.   An addition to the school was made in 1965 with subsequent additions in 1969 and 1983.

Sports

The Ernestown Eagles compete in the Kingston Area Secondary Schools Athletics Association (KASSAA) with thirteen other area schools.  Team colours are forest green and black.  The Eagles compete in Badminton, Basketball, Cross-Country, Football, Ice Hockey, Soccer, Track and Field, Volleyball, Rugby and Wrestling. Until recently, the school also housed a rowing program that trained on Mud Lake, however the program was discontinued after the rowing coach left the school.

Notable alumni and former students

 Aaron Doornekamp, Canadian Interuniversity Sport (CIS) Player of the Year, National team member and CIS first team All-Canadian. Led the Carleton Ravens to four national CIS men's basketball championships.
 Gordon Downie, rock musician and writer, Downie was the lead singer and lyricist of The Tragically Hip.  Downie attended ESS from 1978-1980 (grades 9 & 10).
 Adnan Virk, Sports anchor and reporter, currently at ESPN and formerly on The Score.  Was formerly the associate producer for Sportscentre at TSN. Has called play by play for NBA and NCAA basketball as well as Major League Baseball.
Brett Emmons, rock musician, writer and singer of The Glorious Sons. Emmons attended ESS from 2006-2010

See also
List of high schools in Ontario

External links
 http://ernestownss.limestone.on.ca/

References

High schools in Ontario
1959 establishments in Ontario
Educational institutions established in 1959